Leading Teams is an Australian consulting company focused on leadership and performance in the fields of elite sport business, government, and education. The company's services revolve around their Performance Improvement Program, which involves leadership development, team development and culture change.
Founding Director, Ray McLean, began a pilot program in 1992 involving the Central District Football Club in South Australia. The team's improved performance created interest among the club's corporate partners who became interested in what the team development and culture change programs could achieve in their organisations. Other teams followed suit. McLean also re-oriented the program framework to address the various corporate objectives and was able to apply the principles of the model in a business environment. Now majority of their clients are in the corporate business section, having moved away from solely elite sport.

Since then, Leading Teams has expanded to having twenty full-time facilitators located in Melbourne, Sydney, Perth, Adelaide and Queensland.

A partial listing of the company's partners/facilitators include  Simon Fletcher, Kurt Wrigley , Daniel Healy, Justin Peckett, Aaron Rogers, and  Craig Hodges.

Recognition
 Australian Business Journal Innovation in Corporate Services Award (2012)

References

External links
Leading Teams Official website
Leading Teams LinkedIn

Companies based in Melbourne
Consulting firms established in 1992
1992 establishments in Australia